WVOK-FM (97.9 FM, "97.9 WVOK") is a radio station broadcasting a hot adult contemporary music format. Licensed to Oxford, Alabama, it serves the Anniston-Oxford Metropolitan Area. It is owned and operated by Woodard Broadcasting Company, Inc.

Early history

In 1977, WVOK-FM was launched in Birmingham, Alabama as an Album-Oriented Rock radio station called "K-99." The station broadcast from the 99.5 MHz frequency; it was originally a counterpart to WVOK-AM 690 , one of the more popular Top 40 stations of its era. WVOK-FM changed its call letters to WRKK in 1979; it kept its Rock format until 1983, when it became "K Country." Several format changes later, the station is now known in Birmingham as WZRR "Talk 99.5."

The WVOK call letters would not be heard on the FM dial again until the creation of a new radio station in Oxford, Alabama. Jimmy and Geraldine Woodard, owners of WEYY-FM in Talladega, Alabama, were granted a construction permit for the first commercial FM station licensed to Oxford. The station began broadcast in 1990 as WKFN "K98" on the 97.9 MHz frequency. In 1992, WKFN acquired the WVOK call letters; however, its "K98" nickname remained the same.

Recent history
On February 19, 1990, K98 signed on as an Adult Contemporary station, playing music from the 1950s through the 1990s. At that time, WVOK was one of very few local stations to compete against the 100,000-watt Country music station WHMA of Anniston, known by listeners as "Alabama 100." November 6, 1996 Susquehanna Radio purchased Alabama 100 and moved it to College Park, Georgia in early 2001. After the move, Alabama 100 changed its call letters to WWWQ and became a Top-40 station serving the Atlanta radio market. As a result, WVOK saw an increase in their local Arbitron ratings.

Since K98 began broadcast in 1990, it has employed a number of various disk jockeys, including Rick Burgess from the syndicated "Rick and Bubba" radio program. Its radio format, however, has seen little change. Shortly after Clear Channel station WQEN ("103-7 the Q") relocated its transmitter from Springville, Alabama to Birmingham in early 2005, WVOK briefly changed its music format to Contemporary Hit Radio. They have, however, since returned to the lighter Hot AC format.

In early 2006, WVOK-FM began using its frequency and call letters often (instead of the "K98" nickname) as its station identifier. Its slogan is "The Best of the 80's, 90's and Today".

In early 2008, a new morning talk show called The Steve and Carl Show signed on.

Other facts
 WVOK-FM is recognized as one of the only radio stations in Alabama to remain on the air during the "Storm of the Century" in 1993. WVOK received honors from the city of Oxford, former Alabama Governor Guy Hunt, and others for keeping the station on the air through the duration of the storm.
 WVOK-FM is one of two stations in the Anniston/Gadsden market whose call letters were previously assigned to Top 40 stations in Birmingham.  The other is WKXX.
 There has been much speculation about the WVOK call sign meaning over the years. Although disk jockeys from the original WVOK-AM radio station sometimes referred to it as the Voice Of Kindness, the call letters themselves actually do not stand for anything.

References

External links
WVOK-FM official website

VOK-FM
Hot adult contemporary radio stations in the United States
Oxford, Alabama
Radio stations established in 1990
1990 establishments in Alabama